Arun Daniel Midha (born 24 April 1964) is a British academic, who has sat as a lay member on the General Medical Council and currently sits on the Audience Council Wales and the Welsh Language Board, having learnt the language as an adult.

Midha was educated at  Gowerton Comprehensive School, Exeter College, Oxford, Cardiff Business School and Swansea University.

Until 2009 he was responsible for strategic and business planning of postgraduate medical and dental education in Wales at the School of Postgraduate Medical and Dental Education at Cardiff University.

On the 4th of April 2012, Arun was appointed High Sheriff of South Glamorgan.

References

People from Swansea
People educated at Gowerton Comprehensive School
Alumni of Exeter College, Oxford
Alumni of Cardiff University
Alumni of Swansea University
Academics of Cardiff University
High Sheriffs of Glamorgan
Living people
1964 births